The Black Lion is a Grade II listed public house at South Black Lion Lane, Hammersmith, London.

It dates from the late 18th century.

References

Pubs in the London Borough of Hammersmith and Fulham
Grade II listed pubs in London
Hammersmith